Prairie Valley Community School District is a rural public K-12 school district with a district seat in Gowrie, Iowa.

The district is located in portions of Calhoun and Webster counties, as well as a small portion of Greene County. It serves Gowrie, Callender, Farnhamville, Moorland, Rinard, and Somers.

History
The district formed on July 1, 1993, with the merger of the Cedar Valley Community School District and the Prairie Community School District.

In August 2014, the district began a whole grade-sharing arrangement with the Southeast Webster-Grand Community School District as a way to deal with smaller enrollments and as a way to save money. The two districts together share middle and high schools.

Schools
 Southeast Valley High School currently is the high school for the two districts.
 Southeast Webster-Grand Southeast Valley Middle School, Burnside (jointly with Southeast Webster-Grand Community School District)
 Prairie Valley Elementary School, Farnhamville

Prior to the grade sharing, the Prairie Valley district had two schools: The elementary served pre-kindergarten through 6th grade and is located between Farnhamville and Somers. The Prairie Valley High School served 7th grade through 12th grade and was located in Gowrie.

See also
List of school districts in Iowa

References

External links
 Southeast Valley Schools (joint website of Southeast Webster-Grand CSD and Prairie Valley CSD)

 Southeast Valley grade-sharing agreement

School districts in Iowa
Education in Calhoun County, Iowa
Education in Greene County, Iowa
Education in Webster County, Iowa
1993 establishments in Iowa
School districts established in 1993